"Going Down" is a song recorded by Australian singer-songwriter, Jon Stevens. The song was written by Jon Stevens, Stuart Fraser and R. Pleasance and was the first single taken from Stevens' third solo studio album, Are U Satisfied (1993). The single was released in September 1993 and is Stevens' first original recording since "Lover My Love "/"Running Away" in 1982.

Track listing
CD single (Columbia 659645-1)
 "Going Down" – 3:01	
 "Midnight Train" – 4:00

Charts

References

1993 singles
1993 songs
Jon Stevens songs
Columbia Records singles
Sony Music Australia singles